Rubus pringlei is a Mesoamerican species of brambles in the rose family. It grows in central and southern Mexico and also in Guatemala.

Rubus pringlei is hairless biennial up to 2 meters high, with curved prickles. Leaves are trifoliate. Flowers are white. Fruits are dark purple.

References

pringlei
Flora of Guatemala
Flora of Mexico
Plants described in 1839